Hudson High School (HHS) is a public high school in Hudson, Ohio, United States. It is the only high school in the Hudson City School District and is located on a  campus that has been developed to include a variety of athletic fields, such as six tennis courts, a lighted baseball field, track, and football stadium. As of the 2014–15 school year, the school has an enrollment of 1,631 students, mainly from Hudson and neighboring Boston Township. Athletic teams are known as the Explorers with school colors of navy blue and white, and compete in the Suburban League National Division.

Administration
As of 2022, the head principal was Mike Miller.

From 2009 to 2022, Brian Wilch was the principal.

In March 2005, many of Hudson High School's student body staged a walkout to protest the firing of their principal, Roger Howard.

Facilities
The current building, opened in August 1992, is designed to grow with the community. It was designed by Lesko Architects of Cleveland, Ohio. The academic wing of the high school was built to accommodate 1600 students in 104 teaching stations, while the core facilities such as the library, commons, auditorium, hallways, and offices were designed for a student population of 2200 to 2400. The academic wings are expandable at the east and west ends to increase its capacity to 2400 students.  An expansion on the west side of the building was completed in time for the 2006-2007 school year.

Education
The school was established in 1885, and the first class of students graduated that year.

Today, a number of special education programs and educational options for gifted students are available. Hudson offers numerous courses at the accelerated level, as well as 22 Advanced Placement (AP) courses. HHS also offers several multi-period enrichment classes that include English and Social Studies curricula, including Networking, Contemporary Issues, Service Learning, and New Dimensions. Advanced Placement courses in World Languages are also available. In addition, HHS has technical offerings including basic computer skills, AP Computer Science, and a web design and programming class. Hudson High School also has a music program that includes five choirs, two orchestras, a marching band, two jazz bands, three concert bands, and a percussion ensemble. The high school also publishes a student newspaper, The Explorer.

The high school is also part of the Six District Educational Compact, a joint program of six area school districts (Cuyahoga Falls, Hudson, Kent, Stow-Munroe Falls, Tallmadge and Woodridge) to share access to each of their vocational training facilities and career resources.

Athletics
Hudson High School is a member of the Ohio High School Athletic Association and the National Division of the Suburban League and offers 25 sports and 58 teams in athletic competition. The school colors are navy blue and white. The sports teams are called the Hudson Explorers, named in honor of Hudsonite Lincoln Ellsworth. Hudson's rival is Stow-Munroe Falls High School. Hudson High School's motto is "Don't Give Up The Ship", in honor of Oliver Hazard Perry's battle flag flown on ships on Lake Erie during the War of 1812.

Hudson Memorial Stadium opened in 2012 and is a privately funded stadium with 6,000 seats located on the high school's current campus, replacing the 3000-seat Lavelli Field at the old high school. It was dedicated by the Murdough Family in honor of all the men and women, including those of Hudson, who have sacrificed their lives in war. The school is also in the process of developing the Hudson Tennis Center, which will be completely funded through donations; phase I was unveiled in Fall of 2015 for a cost of $280,000, which included six new courts replacing the six that were installed when the school was built in 1992. The courts were rebuilt from the ground up and included redesigned water drainage between the baseball field and parking lot. Phase II of the Hudson Tennis Center project is planned to include four additional courts, lighting on all courts, and a tennis pavilion. It is projected to cost an additional $900,000. Completion is slated for whenever necessary funding is reached.

State championships
 Girls' field hockey – 1984, 1986, 1996
 Girls' soccer – 2000
 Boys' soccer – 2002
 Boys' cross country – 2001, 2017, 2018
 Girls' softball – 2007
 Boys' lacrosse – 2011

National championships
 Boys' soccer – 2002 by ESPN

Musical groups

Bands
The school's band program primarily includes their marching band, concert bands, and jazz bands.

Concert bands
The concert bands are divided into three concert bands by audition: Wind Symphony, Blue Symphonic Band, and White Symphonic Band.  Wind Symphony is recognized as the most advanced group with the Blue Symphonic Band and White Symphonic Band being equal in skill.  Seating is determined by individual auditions with the directors.

Jazz bands
The Hudson High School Jazz Ensembles emphasize the study of big band and small group jazz in the American traditions of the music.  Opportunities are available for students to audition and participate in as many as 3 big bands and 2 combos (small groups).  The HHS Jazz program is recognized by area and National top artists as a model program for learning to perform in the jazz idiom.  Improvisation and the historical traditions of the music are the foundations of learning to perform all styles from 1900-today.

Orchestra
Hudson High School's orchestras are recognized across the country and Internationally for their dynamic performances.  Earning First Prize in the 2006 International Youth and Music Festival in Vienna, Austria, the ensemble gained the attention of critics and adjudicators as one of the premier orchestra programs in the United States.  There are three ensembles: Chamber Orchestra, Sinfonietta and Symphony Orchestra.  Conducted by Hudson High School alum, Roberto Iriarte, the ensembles routinely earn Superior Ratings at the OMEA State Orchestra Contest as well as its individual members earning top ratings at the OMEA Solo & Ensemble Contest.  The orchestras have enjoyed extensive travel for festivals and masterclasses in Chicago, New York, Orlando, Philadelphia, Toronto, Italy, Austria and Slovakia.  Members of the orchestra also participate throughout Northeast Ohio in the Cleveland Orchestra Youth Orchestra, the Akron Youth Symphony and the Contemporary Youth Orchestra.  Alumni have attended top conservatories and Universities including Julliard, The Curtis Institute (Phila, PA), The Eastman School of Music (University of Rochester), The Shepherd School of Music (Rice University), and The Berklee College of Music (Boston).

Choir

There is a general choir program, a chamber choir, and a show choir. Under former director Mrs. Amy Foulkes, they were invited to and traveled to Carnegie Hall in New York to perform.

Notable alumni
John Edwards - NBA and NBA Development League player
Ben Gedeon -  NFL player
John Herrick - novelist
David Kirkpatrick- film producer, screenwriter, and studio executive
Dante Lavelli - NFL player and member of the Pro Football Hall of Fame
Brad Lepper - archaeologist at the Ohio History Connection
Bill Nagy - NFL player
Louie Rolko - United Soccer League player
Brian Winters - NFL player

References

External links

Hudson City School District official website

High schools in Summit County, Ohio
Educational institutions established in 1885
Public high schools in Ohio
1885 establishments in Ohio